The 2022 United States Senate election in Colorado was held on November 8, 2022, to elect a member of the United States Senate to represent the State of Colorado. Incumbent Democratic Senator Michael Bennet won reelection to a third full term, defeating Republican businessman Joe O'Dea. Originally appointed to the seat in 2009, Bennet won a full term in 2010 and a second full term in 2016. 

Bennet won by a wide margin of nearly 15 points, significantly outperforming his polling. His margin is the highest for a Democrat in a Senate election in Colorado since 1974. This was the first of Bennet’s Senate elections in which he received a majority of the vote.

Democratic convention

Candidates
Bennet was appointed in 2009 by Governor Bill Ritter following the resignation of Ken Salazar to become the Secretary of the Interior under Barack Obama. Bennet was then narrowly elected in 2010 for his first full term. In his most recent election in 2016, he was re-elected to a second term with 49.97% of the vote over Republican El Paso County Commissioner Darryl Glenn.

Due to some of his centrist positions, such as his opposition to Medicare for All and support for fracking, Bennet faced a potential challenge from the left, particularly from Joe Salazar, a former state representative. Salazar ultimately opted to run for Colorado's State Senate, and thus Bennet was easily renominated at the Democratic convention.

Nominee 
Michael Bennet, incumbent U.S. Senator

Eliminated at convention 
Karen Breslin, lawyer and university instructor

Declined 
Joe Salazar, former state representative and candidate for Colorado Attorney General in 2018 (ran for state senate)

Endorsements

Results

Republican primary

Candidates
Originally, a wide field of candidates declared their intention to run for the Republican nomination, with former Olympian Eli Bremer being thought as the best candidate to take on Bennet. However, instead of gathering the needed signatures to be placed on the primary ballot, Bremer and most of the other candidates sought to get 30% of the delegate vote at the Colorado GOP convention in April of 2022. Due to the wide field of candidates, delegate support was split, with the only candidate to achieve the threshold being State Representative Ron Hanks, while Debora Flora, a radio show host, missed the ballot by a single percentage point, getting 29% of the vote, and Bremer getting third place with 15% of the vote.

With the other candidates eliminated, Ron Hanks and construction CEO Joe O'Dea were the only two candidates on the primary ballot. The contrast between the two Republicans was stark, with Hanks, who supported a complete ban on abortion and echoed former President Donald Trump's claims of voter fraud in the 2020 Presidential election, getting pitted against O'Dea, a moderate who supports LGBT rights, some abortion rights, and did not believe in widespread voter fraud. 

Hanks was considered the underdog due to O'Dea consistently outraising him, however he received a boost when Democrats began spending over $4 million to influence the Republican primary, launching ads attempting to drag down O'Dea due to his prior support of Democratic candidates, and prop up Hanks as "too conservative". This was done in the hopes that Hanks would be an easier opponent for Bennet to beat than O'Dea, who can appeal to moderates. This attempt to interfere in the GOP primary was denounced by numerous former Colorado Democratic officials, including former Governor Roy Romer, and former Senators Mark Udall, Tim Wirth, and Gary Hart, who previously mounted unsuccessful attempts to win the Democratic nomination  for President in 1984 and 1988. 

Ultimately, despite the boost from the Democrats and his attempts to receive the endorsement of Donald Trump, Hanks would lose the nomination to O'Dea by 9 points. He performed best in the rural parts of Colorado, which are typically the most conservative counties that typically vote Republican in landslide margins in general elections, while O'Dea performed best in urban counties, such as Denver.

Nominee
Joe O'Dea, construction company owner

Eliminated in primary
Ron Hanks, member of the Colorado House of Representatives for the 60th district (2021–2023)

Eliminated at convention
Eli Bremer, Olympic athlete, U.S. Air Force major and former chair of the El Paso Republican Party
Gino Campana, former Fort Collins council member, city developer
Deborah Flora, former radio host
Juli Henry, nonprofit founder
Gregory J. Moore, Colorado Christian University professor
Peter Yu, businessman and nominee for Colorado's 2nd congressional district in 2018
Daniel Hendricks, small business owner

Withdrew
Erik Aadland, army veteran (became Republican nominee for Colorado's 7th congressional district)

Declined
Ken Buck, U.S. Representative for Colorado's 4th congressional district, chair of the Colorado Republican Party, and nominee for U.S. Senate in 2010
Heidi Ganahl, University Regent (ran for Governor)
Cory Gardner, former U.S. Senator from Colorado (2015–2021)
Darryl Glenn, former Colorado Springs city councilman (2005–2011), former El Paso County commissioner (2011–2019), and nominee for U.S. Senate in 2016 (ran for Mayor of Colorado Springs)
Bill Owens, former Governor of Colorado (1999–2007)
Steven Reams, Weld County sheriff (ran for re-election)
Clarice Navarro, former state Representative

Endorsements

Polling

Results

General election
Colorado had become increasingly Democratic-leaning in recent elections, with President Joe Biden winning the state by 13.5% in the 2020 election, nine points to the left of the national result of around 4.5%. Prevailing in 2010, a year where Colorado was considered a swing state and Democrats performed very poorly, Bennet had a generally strong electoral history. He also outperformed Hillary Clinton on the same ballot in 2016. Ahead of 2022, Bennet was generally favored to win, though polling showed him as potentially vulnerable, largely due to President Biden’s low approval ratings. Colorado had not elected a Republican to the U.S. Senate since Cory Gardner in 2014, another very strong year for Republicans nationwide and while Colorado was still considered a swing state, even then Gardner only won narrowly. Bennet ultimately won reelection by a comfortable 14.5 point margin, outperforming Biden's victory two years prior and his own polling averages.

Predictions

Endorsements

Polling
Aggregate polls

Graphical summary

Michael Bennet vs. Ron Hanks

Michael Bennet vs. Eli Bremer

Michael Bennet vs. Gino Campana

Michael Bennet vs. Lauren Boebert

Michael Bennet vs. generic Republican

Michael Bennet vs. generic opponent

Generic Democrat vs. generic Republican

Debates

Results

See also 
 2022 United States Senate elections
 List of United States senators from Colorado

Notes

Partisan clients

References

External links
Official campaign websites
Michael Bennet (D) for Senate
Joe O'Dea (R) for Senate

2022
Colorado
United States Senate
Michael Bennet